Jean A. Shackelford (born 1946), is the professor of economics emerita in the department of economics at Bucknell University, Lewisburg, central Pennsylvania, US and, from 1993 to 1995, was the president of the International Association for Feminist Economics (IAFFE). Her book Economics: a tool for critically understanding society, co-written with Tom Riddell, Stephen C. Stamos and Geoffrey Schneider, is now in its ninth edition.

Her research interests are: the history of economic thought; economic pedagogy; and, economics and technology.

Education 
Jean Shackleford received her degree from Kansas State University in 1967. Her masters, in 1968, and her doctorate, in 1974, were both from the University of Kentucky. All three qualifications were for economics.

Selected bibliography

Thesis

Books

Chapters in books

Journal articles

Papers

See also 
 Feminist economics
 List of feminist economists

References

External links 
 Jean Shackelford Department of Economics, Bucknell University

1946 births
21st-century American economists
Bucknell University faculty
Feminist economists
Kansas State University alumni
Living people
University of Kentucky alumni
Presidents of the International Association for Feminist Economics